The First Lady of Rwanda is the official title attributed to the wife of the president of Rwanda. The country's current first lady is Jeannette Kagame, wife of President Paul Kagame, who had held the position since March 24, 2000.

First ladies of Rwanda

References

External links
Official First Lady of Rwanda on Twitter

Lists of spouses of national leaders
Politics of Rwanda